The Canon ELPH 490Z, sold as the IXUS Z90 in Europe and IXY G in Japan, was a compact Advanced Photo System point and shoot camera introduced in June 1996. The second model in the ELPH line, it featured a large circular flip-up lens cover with a built-in electronic flash and the same hybrid autofocus system used in the first ELPH. While larger than the original ELPH, the 490Z had a longer zoom lens (22.5-90mm f/5.6-8.9) and other more advanced features.

Canon ELPH cameras
Autofocus cameras
Point-and-shoot cameras
APS film cameras